Mundial ('Worldwide') is the sixth studio album and tenth overall by Puerto Rican rapper Daddy Yankee through El Cartel Records and Sony Music Latin released on April 27, 2010. The album was supported by five official singles: "Grito Mundial", "Descontrol", "El Mejor De Todos Los Tiempos", "La Despedida" and "La Señal". The production explores different music genres than his previous records such as merengue, dance pop and Latin Pop along with reggaeton. It explores lyrics and themes such as romance, sex, money and fame while the main focus is to capture music vibes of the streets of different countries globally. The album was entirely produced by Los de la Nazza and Diesel.

The album was his fifth album the debut at the top of US Billboard Top Latin Albums and peaked there for four consecutive weeks.  Also, it peaked at 29 in Billboard 200 and charted in Ecuador, Chile, Venezuela, Uruguay and Mexico as well. The lead single Grito Mundial was intended to be 2010 FIFA World Coup official song, but those plans were later scrapped. Despite this, the track was chosen for World Cup TV campaigns on Telefutura and ESPN in the United States and on Azteca in Mexico.

Mundial was nominated for a Lo Nuestro Award for Urban Album of the Year and for Best Urban Album at the 10th Annual Latin Grammy Awards . It won the Billboard Latin Music Award for Latin Rhythm Album of the Year in 2011. To promote the album, he performed as an actor in five episodes of CBS soap opera "The Bold and the Beautiful" and latter embarked on the Mundial Tour which contains his first official Europe Leg.

Background
As of early 2010, Daddy Yankee had sold 8 millions of copies worldwide. Barrio Fino was named the Top Selling Latin Album of in The United States of the 2000s and he was crowned as The Top Selling Latin Act of the 2000s. Mundial was intended to be a special edition of his previous album Talento de Barrio. Following the box office success of his Talento de Barrio and the success of the Talento de Barrio Tour, Daddy Yankee Mundial was highly anticipated.

Unlike his previous albums, he describes the album as a mixture of Reggaeton, merengue, perico ripiao, soca and dancehall. Before the release, Daddy Yankee confirmed that the album would include 13 tracks plus 3 bonus tracks on the iTunes version. The album does not include the tracks recorded with Luis Fonsi and Don Omar since Yankee signed for the album to be released under Sony Music and not Universal Music Group. He had also recorded a new song named "Intenso" which was released on his birthday for his fans, but said that it was not going to be on the album.

Album title and release

Title 
About the title of the album, he said: "Reflects my experiences lived in all promotional trips, in summary, Daddy Yankee Mundial is an album with a great musical variety where The Street joins The World."

Release 
The album was first intended to be released on 13 October 2009, then 17 November 2009, and was then was postponed to 13 April 2010. The album was finally released on 27 April 2010. During its first week of release, the album debuted on the US Billboard 200 at number 29, selling over 18,500 copies. Also, the album at number one on Billboard Top Latin Albums Chart and stayed at the top for four consecutive weeks. As of 2012, it had sold over 58,000 copies in the United States. Also it was his fifth album to top US Latin Rhythm Albums.

The album also charted in Uruguay, Mexico, Venezuela and Japan. In Argentina, the album was certified gold for selling over 20,000 copies. Also, it was certified gold in Chile. Also, in Chile the album peaked at 7 at the retail charts according to La Feria del Disco. In Mexico it peaked at number 28 and at number 2 in Uruguay album charts. In Venezuela, it peaked at number 3 on the retail album charts according to Recorland.

Promotion

Singles
Official singles
 "Grito Mundial" was released as the official first single on 8 October 2009 and digitally on October 20, 2009. The music video was filmed in Argentina & Brazil and was premiered on 20 January 2010. The song peaked on #7 on the Billboard Latin Rhythm Airplay. The song was chosen as the official anthem for the 2010 FIFA World Cup but since Ayala would not have owned 100% of the song on profits, he declined and decided to give it to the federation. They chose Shakira's Waka Waka (This Time for Africa) instead.
 "Descontrol" is the second single released for airplay on 12 January 2010 and digitally on 23 February 2010. The song topped the Billboard Latin Rhythm Airplay, and a music video was filmed for the song in New York City and was released on 17 May 2010.
 "La Despedida" is the third single released on 4 August 2010. The song has become the most successful song off the album, reaching #4 in both Billboard Top Latin Songs and Latin Pop Songs. Also, the song has entered the top 10 in many Latin countries due to heavy airplay.

Promo singles
 "El Ritmo No Perdona (Prende)" was released for free download through his official website on 1 July 2009 as the album's buzz single, and the music video was released the same date. The song peaked at number #2 on Billboard Latin Rhythm Airplay. The song is not part of the main track list, but was included as iTunes bonus track of the album.

Track listing

Chart performance

Certifications

|-

See also
 List of number-one Billboard Latin Albums from the 2010s
List of number-one Billboard Latin Rhythm Albums of 2010

References

External links
 DaddyYankee.com — Daddy Yankee's official website

2010 albums
Spanish-language albums
Daddy Yankee albums
Sony Music Latin albums
Merengue albums